Thony (born 15 May 1982; Federica Victoria Johanna Caiozzo) is an Italian singer and actress.

Biography
Thony was born in  Sicily by an Italian father and a Polish mother.  She moved to Rome in 2002 to study singing and music; After a few years of solo live performances, she started
in 2009 a collaboration with the band Jobi 4, resulting in the publication of an EP and an LP.

After these experiences she decided to focus on the solo album, With the Green in My Mouth, produced in 2010 with the Stefano Mariani (sound editor) and published on the web only in 2011.
Thanks to this record, the Italian movie director Paolo Virzì contacted her to work on the soundtrack of his movie upcoming film Every Blessed Day (2012).
During the beginning of the filming, Virzì decided to offer her also the leading female role,
 together with Luca Marinelli.
She was nominated in 2013 for David di Donatello for Best Actress (Italian: David di Donatello per la migliore attrice protagonista).
She published in 2012 the album Birds
 with the collaborations of Leonardo Milani, Zsuzsanna Krazsnai e Andrea Ruggiero, and produced by herself. The song Flowers Blossom is awarded with the Ciak d'oro in June 2013 for best original song.

In 2016 she was announced to be part of a new band called "Malihini" and signed with the London label Memphis Industries

She has the main female role in Daniele Luchetti's "Momenti di trascurabile felicità".

Discography
 2011 - With the Green in My Mouth (Unreleased)
 2012 - Tutti i santi giorni (soundtrack)
 2012 - Birds (GDM/Sony Publishing)
2019 - Hopefully, again (Memphis Industries) *with Malihini*

Filmography

Films

Television

Awards
2019
 Nomination Nastro d’argento - best actress for Momenti di trascurabile felicità
2013
 Ciak d'oro - best original song Flowers Blossom
 Nomination David di Donatello - Best actress for Every Blessed Day
 Nomination Nastro d'argento - Best actress for Every Blessed Day
 Nomination Globo d'oro - Best actress for Every Blessed Day
 Prix d'interprétacion féminine (Best leading female role) Festival du cinema italien di Bastia
 Festival del Cinema di Spello - Best soundtrack for Every Blessed Day
2012
 FICE (Federazione Italiana Cinema D'Essai) - Best beginner actress

References

External links
Bio and Photo - Woolcan
Webpage - Rockit
Facebook fan-page
 
Video interview - Rolling Stone
Video interview - La Repubblica

Living people
Italian film actresses
Italian women singer-songwriters
Italian singer-songwriters
21st-century Italian actresses
1982 births
21st-century Italian singers
21st-century Italian women singers